Women's Downhill World Cup 1984/1985

Final point standings

In Women's Downhill World Cup 1984/85 the best 5 results count.

References
 fis-ski.com

External links
 

World Cup
FIS Alpine Ski World Cup women's downhill discipline titles